Dame Maud Elizabeth Bevan DBE, JP ( Brand; 18 August 1856 – 8 January 1944), daughter of Henry Bouverie William Brand, was president of the Hertfordshire branch of Red Cross and set up a number of massage clinics for disabled soldiers and children. She was one of the first Dame Commanders of the British Empire.

Biography
Maud Elizabeth Brand was born in 1856 in Glynde, Sussex, her father was Henry Bouverie William Brand, 1st Viscount Hampden of Glynde and 23rd Baron Dacre, her mother was 
Lady Elizabeth Georgina (Ellice) Brand. She was the couple's fifth daughter. On 22 October 1885, she married David Augustus Bevan.

Between 1910 and 1938, Bevan worked for the Red Cross, spending part of her time there as president of the Hertfordshire branch of the organisation. During the First World War, she acted as a commandant of Royston auxiliary military hospital. After the war she worked in the Red Cross' Massage and Orthopedics scheme, initially implementing massage clinics for disabled soldiers, before moving on centres for orthopedic massage for children. During the 1920s, she spent some time as a magistrate. Brand's husband had died the previous year, in 1937.

Brand was one of the first women to become a Dame Commander of the British Empire in 1918 for her work as president of Hertforshire Red Cross.

Brand died on 8 January 1944 at Ponters Letty Green, Hertford. Her funeral too place at Glynde Church, and on 22 January 1944, a memorial service was held for her in St Albans Abbey.

References

1856 births
1944 deaths
Dames Commander of the Order of the British Empire
Daughters of viscounts
People from Stevenage
Place of birth missing
Place of death missing
People from Glynde
English justices of the peace